Oura or Ōura may refer to:

Places
Olba (ancient city) in present Anatolia (Asian Turkey)
Ōra, Gunma in Japan
Ōra District, Gunma in Japan
Ōura, Kagoshima also in Japan
Nagasaki foreign settlement also called Oura foreign settlement in Japan
Oura, New South Wales, a small town near Wagga Wagga, Australia
Oura Archipelago, Finland

Other uses
Ōura (surname), a Japanese surname
Oura Health, a Finnish health technology company